South Dakota Highway 251 (SD 251) is a state route in the U.S. state of South Dakota. SD 251's southern terminus is at the Nebraska border, and the northern terminus is at U.S. Route 18 (US 18) and SD 47 in Gregory.

Major intersections

References

External links

251
Transportation in Gregory County, South Dakota